Miodrag "Mića" Popović (23 June 1923 – 23 December 1996) was a Serbian painter, experimental filmmaker and one of the major figures of the Yugoslav Black Wave.

Life and work
Mića Popović was born on 12 June 1923 in Loznica. He finished grammar school in Belgrade. After the Second World War, most of which he spent in Belgrade working at odd jobs, he enrolled the Academy of Fine Arts in Belgrade in 1946. He studied under Ivan Tabaković. Together with Bata Mihajlović, Petar Omčikus, Mileta Andrejević, Ljubinka Jovanović, Kosara Bokšan, and Vera Božicković, he went to Zadar in 1947 and formed the famous "Zadar group". After returning to Belgrade, they were forbidden to return to their university studies, as the authorities viewed the work of the Zadar group as subversive, but sometime later, they were all allowed to return except for Popović, who continued to study on his own.

As a painter, Popović is best known for his informel period (1958–1968) and his "Scenes Painting" (slikarstvo prizora) (from 1968). Among the Scenes Paintings, one of the more notable ones was "May 1, 1985," which memorialized events surrounding an alleged attack on a farmer in Kosovo named Đorđe Martinović.

He also made several films in the 1960s, two of which ("Čovek iz hrastove šume" and "Delije") were banned by the government for their antisocialist content.

Mića Popović was elected a regular member of the Serbian Academy of Sciences and Arts in 1986.

Written works
Sudari i harmonije, (1954)
U ateljeu pred noć, (1962)
Ishodište slike, (1983)
Velika ljubav Anice Huber, (1999)
Putopisni dnevnici (2006)

Films
"Čovek iz hrastove šume", Avala film, 1963
"Roj", Avala film, 1966
"Kameni despot", Filmska radna zajednica, 1967
"Delije", Kino klub, Beograd, 1969
"Burduš", Avala film, 1970

Paintings

References

Books
 

1923 births
1996 deaths
People from Loznica
Yugoslav painters
20th-century Serbian painters
Serbian male painters
20th-century Serbian male artists